Antonius Serra (1610 – October 1669) was a Roman Catholic prelate who served as Bishop of Milos (1642–1669).

Biography
Antonius Serra was born in Chios, Greece in 1610. On 14 July 1642, he was appointed during the papacy of Pope Urban VIII as Bishop of Milos. On 7 September 1642, he was consecrated bishop by Giovanni Battista Maria Pallotta, Cardinal-Priest of San Silvestro in Capite, with Alfonso Gonzaga, Titular Archbishop of Rhodus, and Patrizio Donati, Bishop of Minori, serving as co-consecrators. He served as Bishop of Milos until his death in October 1669.

References 

17th-century Roman Catholic bishops in the Republic of Venice
Bishops appointed by Pope Urban VIII
1610 births
1669 deaths
Clergy from Chios